Vernonia zollingerianoides is a species of flowering plant in the aster family. It is endemic to Java in Indonesia and considered a vulnerable species on the IUCN Red List.

References

zollingerianoides
Endemic flora of Java
Vulnerable plants
Taxonomy articles created by Polbot